is a passenger railway station in the city of Maebashi, Gunma Prefecture, Japan, operated by the private railway operator Jōmō Electric Railway Company.

Lines

Station layout
The station consists of a single island platform connected to the station building by a level crossing.

Platforms

Adjacent stations

History
Ōgo Station was opened on November 10, 1928. The rail facilities at the station were proclaimed Registered Tangible Cultural Properties on July 31, 2007 by the Agency for Cultural Affairs.These include the station building, the train garage, the transformer house, electrical transmission tower, the electrical sub-station, overhead electrical transmission tower and electrical wire retention tower

Surrounding area
former Ōgo town hall
 Ōgo Public Hall

See also
 List of railway stations in Japan

References

External links

  
	

Stations of Jōmō Electric Railway
Railway stations in Gunma Prefecture
Railway stations in Japan opened in 1928
Maebashi
Registered Tangible Cultural Properties